Mother Earth (Italian: Terra madre) is a 1931 Italian drama film directed by Alessandro Blasetti and starring Leda Gloria, Sandro Salvini and Isa Pola. It was made at the Cines Studios in Rome. Along with Blasetti's other early films, it shows a strong influence of Soviet-style realism. A country landowner decides to sell up and move to the city, but later has a change of heart. It was part of Fascist Italy's promotion of rural over urban values.

Cast
 Leda Gloria as Emilia 
 Sandro Salvini as Il duca Marco 
 Isa Pola as Daisy 
 Olga Capri as La governante della tenuta 
 Vasco Creti Nunzio, Il massaro, padre di Emilia 
 Carlo Ninchi as Il commandatore Bordani 
 Franco Coop as Silvano, un contadino
 Raimondo Van Riel as Un contadino nella taverna 
 Giorgio Bianchi as Il cortegiatore di Daisy 
 Ugo Gracci as L'aiutante del massaro
 Umberto Sacripante as Il contadino idiota

References

Bibliography 
 Reich, Jacqueline & Garofalo, Piero. Re-viewing Fascism: Italian Cinema, 1922-1943. Indiana University Press, 2002.

External links 
 

1931 films
Italian drama films
1931 drama films
1930s Italian-language films
Films directed by Alessandro Blasetti
Cines Studios films
Italian black-and-white films
1930s Italian films